Kata or Khata is a town in Kachin State, Myanmar. It lies on the Ayeyarwady River.

Populated places in Kachin State